The 1985 Zolochiv mid-air collision occurred on 3 May 1985 between Aeroflot Flight 8381 (Tu-134) and Soviet Air Force Flight 101 (An-26).

History
Aeroflot Flight 8381, a scheduled flight of a twin-engine Tupolev Tu-134 that departed Tallinn Airport in Estonian SSR, Soviet Union, at 10:38 am on 3 May 1985, for Chişinău in Moldavian SSR, Soviet Union making a stopover at Lviv, Ukrainian SSR, Soviet Union. While descending to Lviv in overcast weather, it collided at 12:13 with Soviet Air Force Flight 101 which had just taken off from Lviv. Both aircraft lost their right wings and tails, went out of control and crashed about one or two minutes later near the village of Zolochiv, Ukrainian SSR, Soviet Union, killing all 94 people on both aircraft.

Civil and military air traffic controllers mislocated both aircraft involved, leading to violations of air traffic control rules.  Among the victims of the disaster were graphics artist Alexander Aksinin, the young Estonian table-tennis player Alari Lindmäe (born 15 September 1967) and two generals of the Soviet Army. The captain of the Aeroflot aircraft, Nikolai Dmitrijev (born 18 October 1931), was a Hero of Socialist Labor and one of the Soviet Union's most decorated civil airline pilots.

References

External links

Aviation accidents and incidents in 1985
1985 in the Soviet Union
Aeroflot
Aviation accidents and incidents in Ukraine
Aviation accidents and incidents in the Soviet Union
Accidents and incidents involving the Tupolev Tu-134
Accidents and incidents involving the Antonov An-26
Mid-air collisions
Mid-air collisions involving airliners
Mid-air collisions involving military aircraft
Aviation accidents and incidents caused by air traffic controller error
History of Lviv Oblast
1985 in Ukraine